Spinone al Lago is a comune (municipality) in the Province of Bergamo in the Italian region of Lombardy, located about  northeast of Milan and about  northeast of Bergamo, on the left bank of the Lake Endine. 

It is home to the 11th century Romanesque sanctuary of San Pietro in Vincoli, restored during the 14th and 15th centuries. The bell tower dates to the 16th century. The interior has some remains of 15th-century frescoes.

Spinone al Lago borders the following municipalities: Bianzano, Casazza, Gaverina Terme, Monasterolo del Castello, Ranzanico.

References